Eurojackpot is a transnational European lottery launched in March 2012. As of September 15, 2017, the countries participating in the lottery are: Croatia, Czech Republic, Denmark, Estonia, Finland, Germany, Hungary, Iceland, Italy, Latvia, Lithuania, Netherlands, Norway, Poland, Slovakia, Slovenia, Spain and Sweden.

The jackpot starts at €10,000,000 and can roll over up to €120,000,000. Playing the Eurojackpot costs €2 per line (except in Lithuania which includes additional game called 'Joker' that increases the price to €3 per line; buying a base ticket without Joker is not an option).

The goal is to match 5 correct numbers out of 50 plus another 2 supplementary numbers out of another 12; the odds of winning the jackpot are 1:140,000,000. There are 12 tiers of prizes for Eurojackpot.

The lottery draw takes place every Tuesday and Friday at 21:00 local time in Helsinki. The evaluation of the winning lottery tickets is done in Germany and Denmark.

Odds

All odds are rounded to the decimal point.

Jackpot behaviour
Up to January 31, 2013 the Eurojackpot lottery had a 'rolldown' clause: in case the jackpot is not won for 12 consecutive draws, the 13th draw will be subject to a rolldown whereby if no winner is able to match all 7 winning numbers, the jackpot is paid out to the next winning tier where a winner is available. It was this clause that set the previous jackpot record of 27,545,857.50 Euros in August 2012, as a German player who correctly matched the 5 main numbers, but only one of the Euronumbers (out of two), walked away with the jackpot in the second prize tier.

For the groups except the first one, the winning amounts are calculated nationally, and they can vary by country based on number of winners, lottery tax and other reasons.

Notable wins

Accurate as of 22-02-2023

The maximum jackpot of €120 million was reached for the first time on Tuesday 19th July 2022. Nobody won in that draw, but a player from Denmark did win in the following draw on Friday 22nd July. 

The second largest jackpot was set on May 20, 2022, when a 15-player syndicate from Germany won €110 million. This prize was the first jackpot over €90 million to be won following Eurojackpot's rule changes in March 2022, which increased the jackpot cap to €120 million.

The previous record, and cap, was 90,000,000.00 Euro. This sum was first won on May 15, 2015 where a person from Czech Republic won the 90,000,000.00 Euro jackpot.

The first event when multiple players have won the same divided jackpot was on 7 January 2017. For the first time, five people (one from each German federal states of Berlin, Niedersachsen and Hessen, with a winner from Denmark and one from the Netherlands) won 18,000,000.00 Euro after a week when the maximum Jackpot with 90,000,000.00 Euro hadn't been drawn. It was followed by the next multiple 5+2 win on 10 February, when a Hungarian player won the country's biggest-ever lottery prize (overtaking the most famous 5/90 Ötöslottó's record with 5092 million Forint, which was 19˙216˙280,26 Euro as in the currency of 28 November 2003).

A Finnish syndicate of 50 players from Siilinjärvi, who had played a system ticket with 4 predictions in the 7/3 system mode for a total amount of 504.00 Euro, won on August 23, 2019 the maximum jackpot amount plus further winnings from the lower prize categories thus the record win of 91,938,695.00 Euro (84,174,472.21 GBP).

On 22 November 2019, 2 German and 1 Hungarian player won 90,000,000.00 Euro. Each player won 30,000,000.00 Euro (The one Hungarian player won more than 10 billion Forint, which is the country's biggest-ever lottery prize, overtaking again the most famous 5/90 Ötöslottó's most record with 6431 million Forint, which was 24˙267˙124,51 Euro as in the currency of 28 March 2020).

The final capped 90,000,000.00 Euro jackpot was won on March 18, 2022, by tickets purchased in Finland and Norway.

On 9 December 2022, 1 Hungarian player won 75,871,602.00 Euro (over 30 billion Forint), breaking the previous record of 10 billion Forint, from the 22 November 2019 draw. Also, 2 other Hungarian player won 745,969.40 Euro(over 300 million Forint), along with the 1 Finnish player, by matching 5+1 numbers.

Notable wins by country

Accurate as of 22-02-2023

The jackpot was paid out 112 times (including one time in rank 2), good for 133 jackpot winners.

History
The Eurojackpot lottery was proposed in 2006, to compete with the EuroMillions lottery. By virtue of a large number of participating countries, the EuroMillions is able to offer considerably larger jackpots than those offered in a single national lottery. After seeing the success of EuroMillions, Germany, Finland, Denmark, Slovenia, Italy and the Netherlands met in Amsterdam in November 2011 to complete the negotiations for the Eurojackpot lottery and to begin the roll out in 2012. After the negotiations, Estonia also decided to participate in the lottery. The first ticket sales began on March 17, 2012 while the first ever draw took place on March 23, 2012.

Spain joined the Eurojackpot from 30 June 2012 with the ticket concession granted to ONCE, the National Organization of Spanish blind people. On February 1, 2013 Croatia, Iceland, Latvia, Lithuania, Norway and Sweden came along. The Czech Republic and Hungary joined the Eurojackpot from October 10, 2014, Slovakia from October 9, 2015 and Poland from September 15, 2017. In comparison, the Eurojackpot has a wider reach of potential players with an audience in local countries of 300 million, compared to the Euromillions of 217 million.

The gameplay changed on Friday October 10, 2014 with the number of the smaller set, the "Euro Numbers", in the Perle machine (later changed with a machine named as Opale XL) increasing from 8 to 10. The odds of winning the jackpot decreased from 1:59,325,280 to 1 in 95,344,200. In March 2022, further changes made to the game rules. The guess range for Euro Numbers expanded from 1-10 to 1-12. The jackpot cap grew to €120 million. In addition, the new EuroJackpot rules also bringed a new draw day on Tuesday. The first drawing with the new rules is planned for March 25, 2022, however the ticket prices not changed. The odds for winning the jackpot will be decreased to 1:139,838,160

Participating countries
Eurojackpot is available to the residents of the countries participating in the official draw i.e. Croatia, Denmark, Estonia, Finland, Germany, Iceland, Italy, Latvia, Lithuania, the Netherlands, Norway, Slovenia, Spain and Sweden. Czech Republic and Hungary joined in October 2014. Slovakia joined in October 2015 and Poland in September 2017. The organisers also provide official websites to support retail sales, where it is possible to view the results of the draws shortly after they are recorded.

Spain is only country to participate in both EuroMillions and Eurojackpot lottery games.

Private operators
A number of non-official online lottery sites provide tickets or bets on the Eurojackpot lottery. Some of these operators are state-licensed, while others are not. Generally, lottery tickets are restricted to purchase by adults, according to the Age of majority in a particular country. Countries such as Slovenia, Iceland and Italy restrict most private operators from offering lotteries.

See also
EuroMillions - a similar transnational lottery in Austria, Belgium, France, Ireland, Luxembourg, Portugal, Spain, Switzerland and the United Kingdom.
Vikinglotto - a similar transnational lottery in Denmark, Estonia, Finland, Iceland, Norway, Latvia, Lithuania, Sweden, Slovenia and Belgium.

References

External links

Lottery games
Mega Ball lottery games